The Malaysian Solidarity Convention was a confederation of political parties formed on 9 May 1965 and existing until 9 August to oppose Article 153 of the Constitution of Malaysia. This article specifically provided special quotas for the Malay and other indigenous peoples of Malaysia in admission to the public service and to public education institutions, and the awarding of public scholarships and trade licences. It also authorised the government to create Malay monopolies in particular trades.  Critics have called such affirmative action for the Malays to be racial discrimination against other Malaysian citizens, with the goal of creating ketuanan Melayu (Malay supremacy).

The rallying motto of MSC was Malaysian Malaysia. It was not a mere tautology because it distinguished between nationality and ethnic classification.  The complaint was that Malaysia was not being "Malaysian" by discriminating against non-Malay Malaysians, and was rather being a "Malay Malaysia".

The MSC functioned as a political bloc which was led by Lee Kuan Yew and the People's Action Party when Singapore was still part of Malaysia. It composed of multi-racial parties such as the PAP, the People's Progressive Party and the United Democratic Party.

At the MSC's first and only general meeting, several leaders from these parties gave speeches supporting a Malaysian Malaysia. D. R. Seenivasagam in his speech accused the National Alliance of using Article 153 of the Constitution of Malaysia to "bully non-Malays".

References

Defunct political party alliances in Malaysia
History of Malaysia since Independence
1965 establishments in Malaysia
Political parties established in 1965